Airport North (Terminal 2) station, is a station of Line 3 of the Guangzhou Metro. It started operations on 26 April 2018 following the opening of Guangzhou Baiyun International Airport's Terminal 2.

Station layout

References

Railway stations in China opened in 2018
Guangzhou Metro stations in Huadu District
Airport railway stations in China